Forest–Moraine Residential Historic District is a national historic district located at Hammond, Lake County, Indiana.   The district encompasses 108 contributing buildings in an exclusively residential section of Hammond. It developed between about 1913 and 1950, and includes notable example of Renaissance Revival, Colonial Revival, Tudor Revival, and English Cottage style residential architecture.

It was listed in the National Register of Historic Places in 2010.

References

Historic districts on the National Register of Historic Places in Indiana
Renaissance Revival architecture in Indiana
Colonial Revival architecture in Indiana
Tudor Revival architecture in Indiana
Historic districts in Hammond, Indiana
National Register of Historic Places in Lake County, Indiana